was a Japanese Imperial court position and the title of the chief education expert in the rigid court hierarchy.  The Imperial Daigaku-no-kami predates the Heian period; and the court position continued up through the early Meiji period.  The title and position were conferred in the name of the Emperor of Japan.

In the Edo period, the head of the educational and bureaucrat training system for the Tokugawa shogunate was also known by the honorific title Daigaku-no-kami, which effectively translates as "Head of the State University". The title and position were conferred in the name of the shōgun.

Imperial court hierarchy
The Imperial court position of Daigaku-no-kami identified the chief education expert in the Imperial retinue. The Daigaku-no-kami was head of the Imperial University, the Daigaku-ryō. The title arose during evolution of governmental reorganizations beginning in 701.

The position and the title ultimately came about under the direction of Prince Osakabe, Fujiwara no Fuhito and Awata no Mahito at the request of Emperor Monmu.  Like many other developments at the time, the title was an adaptation derived from the governmental system of China's Tang dynasty.

The somewhat inflexible hierarchical nature of the court requires that the function of the Daigaku-no-kami be understood both in terms of specific functions and in terms of those ranking above and below in the Ministry of Civil Services.

This ministry collected and maintained  biographical archives of meritorious subjects.

This office was typically filled by a son or close relative of the emperor.  For example, in 773 (Hōki 4), the daigaku-no-kami was Yamabe-shinnō, who was named Crown Prince and heir of Emperor Kōnin. However, there were exceptions to this general rule if there was an especially pre-eminent contemporary scholar, such as in the case of Miyoshi Kiyotsura.

Accompanying the Daigaku-no-kami were seven judges, who directly assisted this minister.

Ranking just below these judges were educational authorities:
 .
 .
 .
 .
 .
 . There would have been many copyist calligraphers working under the direction of the chief calligrapher.
 .
 —two positions.
 —two positions.
 —two positions.

Tokugawa bakufu hierarchy
In the Edo period, this title identifies the head of the chief educational institution of the Tokugawa state.  It was conferred by the shōgun in 1691 when the Neo-Confucian academy moved to land provided by the shogunate. In the years which followed, this academic title became hereditary for the ten descendants of Hayashi Hōkō who were sequential heads of the Yushima Seidō.  The 10 rectors of the institution who were each identified by the title daigaku-no-kami were:
 1st rector (and Daigaku-no-kami): Hayashi Hōkō (1644–1732), formerly Hayashi Nobuhatsu (son of Gahō).
 2nd rector (and Daigaku-no-kami): Hayashi Ryūkō (1681–1758).
 3rd rector (and Daigaku-no-kami): Hayashi Hōkoku (1721–1773).
 4th rector (and Daigaku-no-kami): Hayashi Hōtan (1761–1787).
 5th rector (and Daigaku-no-kami): Hayashi Kimpō (1767–1793), also known as Hayashi Kanjun or Hayashi Nobutaka
 6th rector and 8th Daigaku-no-kami): Hayashi Jussai (1768–1841), formerly Matsudaira Norihira, 3rd son of Iwamura daimyō Matsudaira Norimori—Norihira was adopted into Hayashi family when Kinpō/Kanjun died childless; explained shogunate foreign policy to Emperor Kōkaku in 1804., also known as Hayashi Jitsusai and Hayashi Kō.
 7th rector (and Daigaku-no-kami): Hayashi Teiu (1791–1844).
 8th rector (and Daigaku-no-kami): Hayashi Sōkan (1828–1853).
 9th rector (and Daigaku-no-kami): Hayashi Fukusai (1800–1859), also known as Hayashi Akira, chief Japanese negotiator for the Treaty of Kanagawa
 10th rector (and Daigaku-no-kami): Hayashi Gakusai (1833–1906), formerly Hayashi Noboru, head of the academy in 1867.

The rector of the Yushima Seidō stood at the apex of the country-wide educational and training system which was created and maintained with the personal involvement of successive shōguns. The position as rector of the Yushima Seidō became hereditary in the Hayashi family.

Meiji constitutional hierarchy
In the course of the Meiji Restoration, this Imperial title was abolished; but its position within the ambit of a reorganized government structure would be developed further in the Meiji period Daijō-kan.

See also
 Taihō Code
 Yōrō Code
 Daijō-kan
 Sugawara no Kiyotomo
 Sugawara no Michizane
 Hayashi clan

Notes

References
  Asai T. (1985). Nyokan Tūkai. Tokyo: Kōdansha.
 Cullen, Louis M. (2003). A History of Japan, 1582–1941: Internal and External Worlds. Cambridge: Cambridge University Press. ; 
 De Bary, William, Carol Gluck, Arthur E. Tiedemann. (2005). Sources of Japanese Tradition, Vol. 2. New York: Columbia University Press. ; OCLC  255020415
 Kelly, Boyd. (1999). Encyclopedia of Historians and Historical Writing, Vol. 1. London: Taylor & Francis. 
 Nussbaum, Louis Frédéric and Käthe Roth. (2005). Japan Encyclopedia. Cambridge: Harvard University Press. ; OCLC 48943301
 Ozaki, Yukio. (2001). The Autobiography of Ozaki Yukio: The Struggle for Constitutional Government in Japan. [Translated by Fujiko Hara]. Princeton: Princeton University Press.  (cloth)
  Ozaki, Yukio. (1955). Ozak Gakudō Zenshū. Tokyo: Kōronsha.
 Ponsonby-Fane, Richard. (1959).  The Imperial House of Japan. Kyoto: Ponsonby Memorial Society. OCLC 194887
 Sansom, George. (1958). A History of Japan to 1334. Stanford: Stanford University Press. 
 ___. (1952). Japan: A Short Cultural History. Stanford: Stanford University Press.   (cloth)  (paper)
 Screech, Timon. (2006). Secret Memoirs of the Shoguns:  Isaac Titsingh and Japan, 1779–1822. London: RoutledgeCurzon. 
 Titsingh, Isaac. (1834).  Annales des empereurs du Japon (Nihon Odai Ichiran).  Paris: Royal Asiatic Society, Oriental Translation Fund of Great Britain and Ireland. OCLC 5850691
 Ury, Marian.  (1999). "Chinese Learning and Intellectual Life", The Cambridge history of Japan: Heian Japan. Vol. II. Cambridge: Cambridge University Press.  (cloth)
 Varley, H. Paul, ed. (1980). [ Kitabatake Chikafusa, 1359], Jinnō Shōtōki ("A Chronicle of Gods and Sovereigns: Jinnō Shōtōki of Kitabatake Chikafusa" translated by H. Paul Varley). New York: Columbia University Press.

External links
 National Archives of Japan ...Drawings of the Dajokan Building (November, 1877)
 National Archives of Japan ...Illustration of the new Dajokan Building (1877)
 National Archives of Japan  ...Drawings for construction of the new building housing the ministries of Home Affairs and Finance (1874)

Government of feudal Japan
Officials of the Tokugawa shogunate
Positions of authority
Titles of national or ethnic leadership
Meiji Restoration
Former government ministries of Japan